Hotel Books is an American spoken-word project from Porterville, California revolving around the poetry of Cam Smith. The project is often presented on tour as a full band, but has also been shown as a solo project of Cam Smith.

History 
The band's InVogue Records debut "I'm Almost Happy Here, But I Never Feel at Home" was released July 1, 2014, via InVogue Records. The album received mostly positive reviews, as well as earned the band their first Billboard chartings; No. 9 on Alternative New Artists and No. 20 on Heatseekers, for the album's debut week. Their next effort, "Run Wild, Young Beauty," was released on April 7, 2015, and spent three total weeks on the Billboard charts.

In 2016, Hotel Books released their second long-player "Run Wild, Stay Alive" to negative and mixed reviews. The album focused more on the rock elements and traditional song structure.

In October 2017, Hotel Books released "Equivalency" via InVogue Records to critical acclaim.

Discography 

Other Appearances
 Happy Holidays, I Miss You (2016) - Christmas Eve Until I Leave

References 

Musical groups established in 2011
Musical groups from California
2011 establishments in California